Jacques Raynal is a French Polynesian politician and Cabinet Minister who has served in the governments of Gaston Flosse and Édouard Fritch. He is a member of Tapura Huiraatira.

Raynal is a doctor. He was appointed as Minister of Health in the coalition cabinet of Oscar Temaru in February 2009. In April 2009 he quit the Tahoera'a Huiraatira party.

He was appointed to the cabinet of Édouard Fritch as Minister of Health and Solidarity in January 2017, replacing Patrick Howell. He was reappointed to the Health portfolio following the 2018 French Polynesian legislative election in May 2018. As Health Minister he introduced a Sugary drink tax to counter diabetes. He also oversaw French Polynesia's response to the Covid-19 pandemic.

References

Living people

Year of birth missing (living people)
French Polynesian medical doctors
Tahoera'a Huiraatira politicians
Tapura Huiraatira politicians
Government ministers of French Polynesia
Health ministers of French Polynesia